Holaxyra is a genus of moths in the family Gelechiidae.

Species
Holaxyra acuta (Meyrick, 1927)
Holaxyra ancylosticha (Turner, 1919)
Holaxyra ithyaula (Meyrick, 1926)
Holaxyra picrophanes (Meyrick, 1913)

References

Dichomeridinae